Bruder may refer to:

People
Bruder is a surname. Notable people with the surname include:
 Aimee Bruder (born 1974), American Paralympic swimmer
 Charles Bruder, a victim of the Jersey Shore shark attacks of 1916
 Christian Bruder (born 1982), retired German ski jumper
 Doc Bruder (1901–1952), American football player
 Edith Bruder, French ethnologist specialized in the study of African Judaism and other religious societies
 Hank Bruder (1907–1970), American football player
 Harold Bruder (born 1930), American realist painter
 Holly Bruder, American college softball coach
 Jörg Bruder (1937–1973), Brazilian sailor and geology professor
 Jiří Bruder (1928–2014), Czech film, theatre and voice actor
 Patricia Bruder (born 1936), American actress
 Peter Bruder (1908–1976), American fencer
 Will Bruder (born 1946), American architect

Business
 Bruder Spielwaren, a toy manufacturer

See also
 Brüder, a 2001 EP by the German synthpop band Melotron